Gahima I (also known as Kanyarwanda I, Kayima I, Ghem, Khem, Kakama, Khm among East Africans is recited by the Rwandan "Abiru" (cultural historians and griots) as one of the primal Mwami, or King of Rwanda supposedly after Gihanga's long reign around the Nile source and beyond. Gahima I is believed to be the general ancestral patriarch of the Tutsi and helped unite them with the Twa and the Hutu groups that all form the indigenous Rwandan society. It is not clear whether his reign took place in the location of modern-day Rwanda as variants of his name exist in other parts of East Africa such as Uganda and Tanzania and Egypt as Kayima and Kham where they claim him as their ancient king. He is also believed to be the Biblical Ham commonly cited as of the sons of Noah. Just as he is believed to be the grandson of Gihanga a name that means creator, Gahima's maternal grandfather is orally cited in Rwandan theogony and mythology as Rurenge. A name that signifies an entity with a "Big foot".

Ancestry

References

Tutsi people